Sir William John Milliken-Napier, 8th Baronet of Merchiston (1788 - 1852) was a Scottish politician.

Family

William John Milliken-Napier was a member of the Napier family of Merchiston, Scotland, and was a descendant of John Napier, the inventor of logarithms.

He was the son of Col. Robert John Milliken-Napier of Culcreuch, Stirling and Anne Campbell. On 17 March 1817, he proved his succession to the dormant baronetcy of Merchiston, and became the 8th Baronet. He served as convener of County Renfrew.

On 11 November 1815, he married Eliza Christian, daughter of John Stirling of Kippendavie. They had three children, Mary Napier (1817-1902) (who married Robert Speir, of Burnbrae, Renfrewshire and Culdees, Perthshire), Robert John Milliken-Napier, 9th Baronet (1818-1884), and John Stirling Milliken-Napier (1820-1891)

References

William
Baronets in the Baronetage of Nova Scotia
1788 births
1852 deaths